The plain-backed pipit  or plain pipit (Anthus leucophrys) is a medium-sized passerine bird which is a resident breeder in Africa south of the Sahara Desert.

It is found in open habitats, especially short grassland and cultivation. It builds its cup-shaped nest on the ground and usually lays three eggs. Like other pipits, this species is insectivorous.

The plain-backed pipit is a large pipit at 17 cm, but is otherwise an undistinguished looking species, faintly streaked grey-brown above and pale below with light breast streaking. It has a strong white supercilium, and dark moustachial stripes. It has long legs and tail, and a long dark bill. Sexes are similar, but juveniles have warmer brown upperparts.

Some care must be taken to distinguish this species from wintering tawny pipits, Anthus campestris. The plain-backed pipit is sturdier and darker than the Tawny, and stands more upright. Perhaps the best distinction is the characteristic "ssissik" call, quite different from the tawny pipit's "tchilip".

References

 Birds of The Gambia by Barlow, Wacher and Disley, 
 Plain-backed pipit - Species text in The Atlas of Southern African Birds.

plain-backed pipit
Birds of Sub-Saharan Africa
plain-backed pipit
plain-backed pipit